Nadav Aviv Nidam (born 11 April 2001) is an Israeli professional footballer who plays as a midfielder for Hapoel Jerusalem on loan from Maccabi Tel Aviv.

Early life
Nidam was born in Modi'in, Israel, to a family of Jewish descent. His parents were English-born people of Jewish descent.

Club career
After coming through the academy, Nidam made his professional league debut for Maccabi Tel Aviv in April 2019 as a late substitute in a 4–1 win over Maccabi Netanya.

International career
Nidam has represented Israel at various youth international levels.

References

External links

2001 births
Living people
Israeli people of English-Jewish descent
Israeli Jews
Israeli footballers
Footballers from Modi'in-Maccabim-Re'ut
Association football midfielders
Israel youth international footballers
Israeli Premier League players
Liga Leumit players
Maccabi Tel Aviv F.C. players
Beitar Tel Aviv Bat Yam F.C. players
Hapoel Ironi Kiryat Shmona F.C. players
Hapoel Jerusalem F.C. players
Israel under-21 international footballers